For What It's Worth is the debut studio album by American melodic hardcore band Stick to Your Guns following their initial self-released 2004 EP titled Compassion Without Compromise. Originally released in 2005 by This City Is Burning Records, For What It's Worth was re-released on February 20, 2007 by Sumerian Records with two additional bonus tracks.

Track listing
"For What It's Worth..." – 3:35
"A Poor Mans Poor Sport (Two Heads Are Better Than One)" – 3:10
"Colorblind" – 2:55
"Compassion without Compromise" – 3:31
"For the Kids, by the Kids" – 2:32
"Badge a Brand" – 2:43
"This Is More" – 1:48
"Fire with Fire" – 3:13
"Our Demise" – 2:45
"All Time Low" – 2:16
"Fashion or Fascist" – 0:40
"There Is No I in Team" – 2:26
"Industry of Infamy" – 2:20
"This Is Where My Heart Lies" – 3:21
"Such an Outrage" (2007 reissue bonus track) – 3:10
"Laugh Right Back" (2007 reissue bonus track) – 6:26

Band members
 Jesse Barnett – lead vocals, additional guitars
 Curtis Pleshe – lead guitar, backing vocals
 Justin Rutherford – rhythm guitar, backing vocals
 Noah Calvin – bass, backing vocals
 Casey Lagos – drums, backing vocals

References

2007 albums
Stick to Your Guns (band) albums